(J. Jiku Hōgo; K. Ch’uk Pǒphom c. 233-310) was one of the most important early translators of Mahayana sutras into Chinese. Several of his translations had profound effects on East Asian Buddhism. He is described in scriptural catalogues as Yuezhi in origin.

Life
His family lived at Dunhuang, where he was born around 233 CE. At the age of eight, he became a novice and took the Indian monk named Zhu Gaozuo as his teacher.

As a young boy, Dhamaraksa was said to be extremely intelligent, and journeyed with his teacher to many countries in the Western Regions, where he learned Central Asian languages and scripts. He then traveled back to China with a quantity of Buddhist texts and translated them with the aid of numerous assistants and associates, both Chinese and foreign, from Parthians to Khotanese. One of his more prominent assistants was a Chinese upāsaka, Nie Chengyuan, who served as a scribe and editor.

Dharmaraksa first began his translation career in Chang'an (present day Xi'an) in 266 CE, and later moved to Luoyang, the capital of the newly formed Jin Dynasty. He was active in Dunhuang for some time as well, and alternated between the three locations. It was in Chang'an that he made the first known translation of the Lotus Sutra and the Ten Stages Sutra, two texts that later became definitive for Chinese Buddhism, in 286 and 302, respectively. He died at the age of seventy-eight after a period of illness; the exact location of his death is still disputed.

Works
Altogether, Dharmaraksa translated around 154 sūtras. Many of his works were greatly successful, widely circulating around northern China in the third century and becoming the subject of exegetical studies and scrutiny by Chinese monastics in the fourth century. His efforts in both translation and lecturing on sūtras are said to have converted many in China to Buddhism, and contributed to the development of Chang'an into a major center of Buddhism at the time.

Some of his main translations are: 
Saddharmapundarika Sūtra, the "Lotus Sutra"
Pañcaviṃśatisāhasrikā Prajñāpāramitā Sūtra (The Perfection of Wisdom Sutra in 25,000 Lines)
The Dasabhūmika-sūtra (Ten Stages Sutra)
The Lalitavistara Sūtra
The Vimalakīrtinirdeśa
The Tathāgataguhyaka Sūtra (Secrets of the Tathāgata)
The Bhadrakalpikasūtra
The Śūraṅgama Samādhi Sūtra
Akṣayamatinirdeśa

See also
Lokaksema (Buddhist monk)
History of Buddhism
Silk Road transmission of Buddhism

References

Bibliography
 Boucher, Daniel (2006). Dharmaraksa and the Transmission of Buddhism to China, Asia Major 19, 13-37
 Boucher, Daniel. Buddhist Translation Procedures in Third-Century China: A Study of Dharmaraksa and His Translation Idiom. Ann Arbor, MI: UMI Microform. 1996. Print.
 Wood, Francis. The Silk Road: Two Thousand Years in the Heart of Asia. Berkeley, CA: University of California Press, 2002.

External links
Digital Dictionary of Buddhism (log in with userID "guest")
Texts associated with Dharmaraksa

230s births
Year of death unknown
Jin dynasty (266–420) Buddhists
Chinese scholars of Buddhism
Chinese Buddhist missionaries
Buddhist monks from the Western Regions
Buddhist translators
Missionary linguists
3rd-century Chinese translators
4th-century Chinese translators
Sanskrit–Chinese translators